The 2015 SCTV Awards honored popular Indonesian television programming and music. The 2015 edition was held at Studio 6 Emtek City in Daan Mogot, West Jakarta, on November 28, 2015. The ceremony was hosted by Andhika Pratama, Gading Marten, Audi Marissa, and Uus and was broadcast live on SCTV. Attendees included Syahrini, Five Minutes, CJR, Shae and many others.

Nominations were made by the public through SMS messages. A set of judges then determined the winners. SCTV added three categories to this year's awards: Most Famous Television Film, Most Famous Movie and Most Famous Infotainment. They had a special category: Most Popular Foreign Program, which was awarded to Turkish TV series program Elif.

Performances

Presenters
 Michelle Ziudith, Rizky Nazar, and Dimas Anggara – Most Famous Supporting Actor
 Ganteng-Ganteng Serigala Returns' cast – Most Famous Singer
 Gading Marten, Andhika Pratama, and Uus – Most Famous Supporting Actress
 Syahrini, Ernest Prakasa, Kemal Pahlevi, Arif Didu, and Mo Sidik – Most Famous Soap Opera Soundtrack
 Rizky Nazar, Ricky Harun, Aliando Syarief, and Kevin Julio – Most Famous Advertisement
 Tsania Mawar, Alatarik Syah, and Rizky Nazar – Most Popular Foreign Program
 Syahrini – Most Famous Presenter
 Pangeran' cast – Most Famous Television Film
 Rizki & Ridho D'Academy, Lesti D'Academy, and Salsadilla – Most Famous Infotainment
 Audi Marissa and Hardi Fadillah – Most Famous Movie
 Dion Wiyoko, Adila Fitri, and Michelle Ziudith – Most Famous Leading Actor
 Shandy Syarief, Bobby Maulana, Kia Florita, and Chaca Thakya – Most Famous Leading Actress
 Andhika Pratama, Audi Marissa, Gading Marten, and Uus – Most Famous Soap Opera

Nominees and winners
The nominees were announced on October 30, 2015. Winners are highlighted in bold.

References

External links
 Liputan6.com: SCTV Awards

2015 film awards
2015 television awards
2015 music awards
2015 in Indonesian television